The Statement (1995) is a thriller novel by Northern Irish-Canadian writer  Brian Moore. Set in the south of France and Paris in the early 1990s, The Statement is the tale of Pierre Brossard, a former officer in the pro-Fascist militia which served Vichy France, and a murderer of Jews. It was published by Bloomsbury in the United Kingdom in 1995 and by E.P. Dutton in the United States on 1 June 1996.

Plot summary
Now 70 years old, Brossard has spent the better part of his life in hiding, traveling among the monasteries and abbeys that offer him asylum. Though he has evaded capture for decades with the help of the French government and the Catholic Church, now a new breed of government officials is determined to break decades of silence and expose and expiate the crimes of Vichy.

Inspiration
The character of Pierre Brossard in The Statement is inspired by Paul Touvier (1915–1996), a French Nazi collaborator who was arrested for war crimes in 1989. After his arrest, charges appeared in the media alleging that Touvier had been protected by the Roman Catholic Church and government officials. In 1994, Touvier became the first Frenchman ever convicted of crimes against humanity, for his participation in the Holocaust under Vichy France.

Critical response
Emma Hagestadt, writing in The Independent, said that "the late Brian Moore's 18th novel is also one of his best – a gripping moral thriller based on the real life story of Paul Touvier, 'the torturer of Lyon'" and described it as "Tautly written and steeped in atmosphere".

Film adaptation
The novel was adapted into a 2003 film directed by Norman Jewison and starring Michael Caine and Tilda Swinton. The screenplay was written by Ronald Harwood.

References

1995 British novels
1995 Canadian novels
Anti-Catholic publications
Bloomsbury Publishing books
British novels adapted into films
Canadian novels adapted into films
Canadian thriller novels
E. P. Dutton books
Novels by Brian Moore (novelist)
Novels set in France
Novels set in Paris
French collaborators with Nazi Germany